Bill Bryson's African Diary is a 2002 book by bestselling travel writer Bill Bryson. The book details a trip Bryson took to Kenya in 2002. Bryson describes his experiences there and observations about Kenyan culture, geography, and politics, as well as his visits to poverty-fighting projects run by CARE International, to which he donated all royalties for the book.

Reception
In a review published in the Guardian Lionel Shriver was critical of the book's length, describing it as "less a book than a pamphlet".  Shriver also disliked the book's tone, "a po-faced, gee-whizz sincerity ill-suited to a writer who has made his reputation for being light and wry (and even snide) in droll travel books."

References

Books by Bill Bryson
African studies
African travel books
Books about Africa
Books about Kenya
Doubleday (publisher) books
American travel books